The women's 55 kg competition of the karate events at the 2019 Pan American Games in Lima, Peru was held on August 10 at the Polideportivo de Villa El Salvador.

Results

Pool 1

Pool 2

Finals

References 

Karate at the 2019 Pan American Games
Pan American Games